Antonino Rocca (born Antonino Biasetton; 13 April 1921 – 15 March 1977) was an Italian Argentine professional wrestler. He tag teamed with partner Miguel Pérez. He was posthumously inducted into the WWE Hall of Fame as a member of the class of 1995 and the Wrestling Observer Newsletter Hall of Fame in 1996.

Professional wrestling career 
As a soccer and rugby player when he moved to Argentina before World War II, Rocca was known for his unique, acrobatic, off-the-ground, flying wrestling style. He began his American professional wrestling career in the late 1940s in Texas. He had been trained by former World Heavyweight Wrestling Champion Stanislaus Zbyszko in Argentina. In the early 1950s, he held two regionally recognized World Heavyweight Championships while still headlining nationwide, frequently in territories where other wrestlers were the recognized champions.

Capitol Wrestling Corporation/World Wide Wrestling Federation (1949–1976) 
In 1949, Rocca started wrestling in the New York City-area territory for Joseph Raymond "Toots" Mondt, and the Johnston family of promoters, which controlled wrestling at Madison Square Garden, and Mondt owned Rocca's exclusive contract. The territory had been one of the four largest-grossing areas up until the mid-1930s New York, and would later be run by Capitol Wrestling Corporation (CWC, now WWE).

Rocca later formed a tag team with Jose Miguel Pérez in 1957. Together, they captured the NWA World Tag Team Championship, which was the top tag team title used in the CWC, and like so many other titles, was a regional one. They were never defeated after winning this title, but the appellation was abandoned after about five years. 

In 1959-60, Rocca worked with Kola Kwariani and under Jack Pfefer, took effective control of the Garden's wrestling office. Kwariani had just broken away from his partnership with Vince McMahon, Sr. Rocca then set the post-World War II record for wrestling-attendance at Madison Square Garden's 49th–50th Street location, drawing 21,950 fans in a singles match against an obscure wrestler named "The Amazing Zuma", also known as "Argentina Zuma", on 2 January 1960, as reported in The New York Times. 

This was part of a series of three matches between the two held during a four-month period, when the pair drew, on another night, almost as many fans to the Garden. Rocca had also been provided with new wrestler Bruno Sammartino as a tag team partner. However, when this team failed to sell-out the Garden, the pair was split up to wrestle each other in the hopes that business would pick up, but it did not.

McMahon Sr. eventually took back the New York territory and built it by first featuring "Nature Boy" Buddy Rogers and then, a few years later, the by-then charismatic Sammartino as its champion.

In 1963, the CWC left the NWA when it was renamed the World Wide Wrestling Federation (WWWF). WWE history lists a tournament final to crown the first WWWF World Heavyweight Champion as Buddy Rogers over Rocca on 29 April 1963 in Rio de Janeiro, Brazil,  Rogers had legitimately held the NWA World Heavyweight Championship, but lost that title to Lou Thesz in Toronto earlier in 1963 in a match – and rematch – ignored by the New York City and Chicago promoters.

After a demotion, and with the arrival of Buddy Rogers as the featured star at the Garden in 1961, within a few years Rocca left the WWWF and briefly set up a competing promotion (supported by Jim Crockett and others) based at the Sunnyside Arena in Queens, New York. In the mid-1970s, he teamed up with Vince McMahon to handle the color commentary on the WWWF's weekly television show. He provided color commentary on WWF Championship Wrestling and All-Star Wrestling from 1972-76, a role later filled by Sammartino.

Abroad 
Rocca was involved as a professional wrestler, but also as a referee in Japan during the late 1960s and early 1970s. He refereed a number of matches for the Japan Pro Wrestling Association (JWA), and later followed Antonio Inoki to New Japan Pro-Wrestling in 1972.

In 1973, he joined the World Wrestling Council (WWC) in Puerto Rico with partner Miguel Pérez. They captured the defunct WWC North American Tag Team Championship on 11 September 1976 by defeating Los Infernos. They lost the championship to Higo Hamaguchi and Gordon Nelson on 16 October.

Other media
Rocca was depicted wrestling Superman on the cover of the Superman No. 155 (August 1962) comic book. The 1976 horror film Alice, Sweet Alice, featuring child actress Brooke Shields, includes Rocca in a bit part. His fame extended into various media outlets, from numerous interviews for national newspapers and magazines to meeting President Richard M. Nixon to a guest appearance on The Tonight Show with Johnny Carson.

Personal life 
Maestro Arturo Toscanini, a professional wrestling fan, was good friends with Rocca.

Rocca died on 15 March 1977 at Roosevelt Hospital in New York City after complications following a urinary infection. His funeral was attended by thousands and made the front page of New York newspapers.

Championships and accomplishments 

 Montreal Athletic Commission
 MAC World Heavyweight Championship (1 time)
 American Wrestling Association (Ohio)
 AWA World Heavyweight Championship (Ohio version) (1 time)
 Stampede Wrestling
 Stampede Wrestling Hall of Fame (Class of 1995)
 Capitol Wrestling Corporation/Worldwide Wrestling Federation/World Wrestling Federation
 NWA World Tag Team Championship (Northeast version) (1 time) – with Miguel Pérez
 NWA/WWWF International Heavyweight Championship (1 time, inaugural)
 WWF Hall of Fame (Class of 1995)
 Southwest Sports, Inc.
 NWA Texas Heavyweight Championship (2 times)
 World Wrestling Council
 WWC North American Tag Team Championship (1 time) –  with Miguel Pérez.
 Professional Wrestling Hall of Fame and Museum
 Class of 2003
 Wrestling Observer Newsletter
 Wrestling Observer Newsletter Hall of Fame (Class of 1996)

See also
 List of premature professional wrestling deaths

References

External links 
 
 Wrestling Museum profile
 
 

1921 births
1977 deaths
20th-century American male actors
Argentine male professional wrestlers
American male professional wrestlers
Italian emigrants to Argentina
Italian male professional wrestlers
Professional Wrestling Hall of Fame and Museum
WWE Hall of Fame inductees
Stampede Wrestling alumni
20th-century professional wrestlers